Take a Look Inside is the debut studio album by the Folk Implosion. It was released on Communion in 1994. The album experienced an uptick in sales after the release of "Natural One", selling around 10,000 copies.

Critical reception

Trouser Press called the album "more ambitious [than previous releases] thanks in part to minor studio tinkering (on the reverb-laden 'Blossom') and in part to snappy genre juxtapositions — like the Mersey-punk title track and the Lennonish 'Slap Me'." The New Rolling Stone Album Guide called the album "a lightweight goof, rocking through 14 catchy songs in 22 minutes."

Track listing

Personnel
Credits adapted from liner notes.

The Folk Implosion
 Lou Barlow – performance, arrangement, mixing
 John Davis – performance, arrangement, mixing

Additional personnel
 Tim O'Heir – mixing

References

External links
 

1994 debut albums
The Folk Implosion albums